La  (The Liberation of Bethulia) is a libretto by Pietro Metastasio which was originally commissioned by Emperor Charles VI and set to music by Georg Reutter the Younger in 1734. It was subsequently set by as many as 30 composers, including Niccolò Jommelli (1743), Ignaz Holzbauer (1752), Florian Leopold Gassmann (1772), Joseph Schuster (1787), and most famously Wolfgang Amadeus Mozart (1771).

Mozart's setting
The work of Mozart is the best known, if only because the composer's output receives more examination. Composed in March to July 1771 when Mozart was 15 years old, K. 118 (74c) is a 140-minute  on a text by Metastasio tracing the story of Judith beheading Holofernes from the biblical Book of Judith. It was commissioned in March 1771 by Giuseppe Ximenes, Prince of Aragon, while Mozart and his father Leopold were on the way home to Salzburg from their first journey to Italy. It is the only oratorio Mozart ever wrote. Its two parts comprise sixteen arias, with solo or choral parts, scored for soloists, choir and orchestra. Not performed in Mozart's lifetime, La Betulia liberata is shaped stylistically to works by Leonardo Leo and Johann Adolph Hasse.

Recent high-profile performances of Mozart's setting include one in the 2006 Salzburg Festival conducted by Christoph Poppen, as part of the M22 series, masterminded by Bernhard Fleischer to perform all Mozart's operas (and the only oratorio) in 2006 Salzburg Festival. The performance was recorded and subsequently released as DVD. (See Recordings section below.) In 2010 both the Mozart and the Jommelli settings were performed side by side at the Salzburg Whitsun and Ravenna festivals under the leadership of Riccardo Muti.

Roles
 Ozia, prince of Bethulia (tenor)
 Giuditta, widow of Manasses (alto)
 Amital, noblewoman of Israel (soprano)
 Achior, prince of the Ammonites (bass)
 Cabri and Carmi, chiefs of the people (sopranos)
 Bethulians (chorus)

Structure
First part
 Overtura
 Recitative: Popoli di Betulia (Ozia)
 Aria #1: D'ogni colpa la colpa maggiore (Ozia)
 Recitative: E in che sperar? (Cabri, Amital)
 Aria #2: Ma qual virtù non cede (Cabri)
 Recitative: Già le memorie antiche (Ozia, Cabri, Amital)
 Aria #3: Non hai cor (Amital)
 Recitative: E qual pace sperate (Ozia, Amital, chorus)
 Aria with chorus #4: Pietà, se irato sei (Ozia, chorus)
 Recitative: Chi è costei che qual sorgente aurora (Cabri, Amital, Ozia, Giuditta)
 Aria #5: Del pari infeconda (Giuditta)
 Recitative: Oh saggia, oh santa (Ozia, Cabri, Giuditta)
 Aria with chorus #6: Pietà, se irato sei (Ozia, chorus)
 Recitative: Signor, Carmi a te viene (Cabri, Amital, Carmi, Ozia, Achior)
 Aria #7: Terribile d'aspetto (Achior)
 Recitative: Ti consola, Achior (Ozia, Cabri, Achior, Giuditta)
 Aria #8: Parto inerme, e non pavento (Giuditta)
 Chorus #9: Oh prodigio! Oh stupor! (Chorus)

Second part
 Recitative: Troppo mal corrisponde (Achior, Ozia)
 Aria #10: Se Dio veder tu vuoi (Ozia)
 Recitative: Confuso io son (Achior, Ozia, Amital)
 Aria #11: Quel nocchier che in gran procella (Amital)
 Recitative: Lungamente non dura (Ozia, Amital, chorus, Cabri, Giuditta, Achior)
 Aria #12: Prigionier che fa ritorno (Giuditta)
 Recitative: Giuditta, Ozia, popoli, amici (Achior)
 Aria #13: Te solo adoro (Achior)
 Recitative: Di tua vittoria (Ozia, Amital)
 Aria #14: Con troppa rea viltà (Amital)
 Recitative: Quanta cura hai di noi (Cabri, Carmi, Ozia, Amital)
 Aria #15: Quei moti che senti (Carmi)
 Recitative: Seguansi, o Carmi (Ozia, Amital, Cabri, Achior, Giuditta)
 Aria with chorus #16: Lodi al gran Dio (Giuditta, chorus)

Recordings
(Conductor, label, catalogue number, year)
Leopold Hager, Philips, 422522-2
Carlo Felice Cillario, A. Charlin, AMS 2627/8-2
Mario Rossi, Opera d'Oro
Peter Maag, Brilliant Classics, 99944 (also in earlier Complete Works box, 92540)
Riccardo Favero, Brilliant Classics, 94496 (also in updated Complete Works box, 94051)
Christoph Poppen, Deutsche Grammophon, DVD 4400734248
Michi Gaigg, Challenge Records, Super Audio CD CC72590, 2013
Christophe Rousset, Aparté, AP235, 2020

Settings by other composers
Antonio Salieri in 1820 revised Florian Leopold Gassmann's La Betulia liberata by shortening some recitatives and arias, and adding additional choirs taken from Gassmann's other compositions.

As a student of Antonio Salieri, Franz Schubert set "Te solo adoro", Anchior's aria from the second part, as a composition exercise for four voices in November 1812. The exercise was first published in 1940, and, catalogued as D. 34, again in the New Schubert Edition in 1986.

References

External links
 
 
 Franz Schubert, with corrections by Antonio Salieri. Autograph of "Te solo Adoro" for SATB (D 34) at schubert-online.at by Austrian Academy of Sciences (OAW)

Compositions by Wolfgang Amadeus Mozart
1771 compositions
Classical church music
Libretti by Metastasio
1734 operas
1771 operas
Oratorios based on the Bible